The Large High Altitude Air Shower Observatory (LHAASO) is a gamma-ray and cosmic-ray observatory in Daocheng, in the Garzê Tibetan Autonomous Prefecture in Sichuan, China. It is designed to observe air showers triggered by gamma rays and cosmic rays. Observations started in April 2019.

It has three underground observing pools, each “more than triple the size of the Water Cube (National Aquatic Center) in Beijing”. One of the pools is designed to contain  of water. The pools will contain 12 telescopes to capture high-energy photons. Cherenkov radiation detectors are used. Research teams from Australia and Thailand will participate in the project directly, with others expressing interest.

The observatory works essentially as the CASA-MIA observatory did but with a bigger surface array, better muon detectors, improved designed layout and at higher altitude.

Scientific results 
On 17 May, 2021, LHAASO Discovers a Dozen PeVatrons and Photons Exceeding 1 PeV including one at 1.4 PeV.

See also 
 List of astronomical observatories
 High Altitude Water Cherenkov Experiment

References 

Cosmic-ray telescopes
Astronomical observatories in China